Ethel Irving (1869–1963) was a British stage actress. She also appeared in five films. She was the daughter of stage actor Joseph Irving (died 1870) and the wife of actor Gilbert Porteous (died 1928)

Selected filmography
 Under Crimson Skies (1920)
 Michael O'Halloran (1923)
 A Peep Behind the Scenes (1929)
 Call Me Mame (1933)

References

Bibliography
 Samuel J. Rogal. A William Somerset Maugham Encyclopedia. Greenwood Publishing Group, 1997.

External links

1869 births
1963 deaths
British film actresses
British stage actresses
Actresses from London